Sogdiyona Jizzakh (Uzbek: Soʻgʻdiyona Jizzax Futbol Klubi / "Сўғдиёна" Жиззах Футбол Клуби), formerly known as Sogdiana, is an Uzbek professional football club based in Jizzakh, that plays in the Uzbekistan Super League.

Football Club Sogdiyona Jizzakh was founded in 1970, it is named after the ancient historical area of Sogdia. In Soviet times, the club was mainly involved in the Second and First leagues of the USSR Championship. In 1979 it became the winner of zone "Central Asia" of the Second League of the USSR. In the debut drawing of the Uzbekistan Higher League in 1992, Sogdiana sensationally won the bronze medal of this league, an achievement which is still the highest in their history. Besides, they have three times became the winners of the Uzbekistan First League (now called the Uzbekistan Pro League), once won silver league medal, also were two-time winners of the Uzbekistan League Cup.

History 

Founded in 1970 under the name "Jizzakh" (some sources DSC), in the same year made his debut in Soviet Second League B, getting on the end of the penultimate tournament in 17th place. Since 1973 he participated in the USSR Second League, and in 1979 he was able to get a ticket to the USSR First League. In the USSR First League participated until 1985, and after departure again began to participate in the Second League. Until the dissolution of the USSR club participated in the USSR Second League. In the USSR Cup, max reached the 1/16 final in the season 1985/1986. In some periods, when the club flew even from the Second League, he participated in the Uzbekistan SSR Championship. In Soviet times, the club was an army team.

After Uzbekistani independence, the first Championship of Uzbekistan was played in 1992, and Sogdiana was included in the Highest League of the country. In that season, Sogdiana sensationally won bronze medals, and the championship was divided by Pakhtakor and Neftchi Ferghana because of the same number of points, and therefore silver medals were not awarded in that season to anyone. Until 2002 Sogdiana participated in the Higher League, but in the 2002 season took the last 16th place, flew to the Uzbekistan First League. In 2003, taking first place in the First League, is back in the Higher League, but in 2006 was again relegated to the second division. Through the season managed to get back in the big leagues, but twice and flew back to the top division of the country, thus becoming the "club lift". From 2013 to the present time again in the Higher League (since 2018 Uzbekistan Super League). In 2011 and 2012, won the Uzbekistan PFL Cup. In 2022, the club became the first team to enter AFC Cup as standby team after fellow Uzbek club FC Nasaf won the play-off at AFC Champions League.

Name changes

Domestic

Continental

Stadium
The stadium of Sogdiana, Jizzakh Stadium was built in 1970 with capacity 9,000. In 2012, the stadium was closed for the reconstruction. In 2013–14 season, Sogdiana played its home matches at Zaamin stadium. The construction works of renovated Markaziy Stadium were finished in 2015. The stadium changed its name to sporting complex Sogdiana and holds 11,650 spectators. On 26 June 2015, the stadium was officially opened with the league match between Sogdiana and Kokand 1912, in which Sogdiana emerged victorious with a 2–1 win.

Women's football
The club also operated a women's football team, also called Sogdiana Jizzakh, and had participated in the 2022 AFC Women's Club Championship.

Players

Current squad

Honours

Soviet Union 
Zone 5 "Central Asia" USSR Second League:
 Champions: 1979
Uzbekistan SSR Championship:
 Champions: 1972

Uzbekistan 
Uzbekistan Super League:
 Second place: 2021
 Third place: 1992
Uzbekistan First League:
 Champions: 2003, 2007, 2012
 Second place: 2010
Uzbekistan League Cup:
 Winner: 2011, 2012

Managers

References

External links
 PFK Sogdiana Jizzakh Official website  
 Sogdiana Jizzakh at Soccerway

Football clubs in Uzbekistan
Association football clubs established in 1970
1970 establishments in Uzbekistan
Jizzakh Region